Doveton, is a neighbourhood in Purasawalkam and Vepery, and is a shopping district in Central Chennai, a metropolitan city in Tamil Nadu, India. It is the unofficial name of the neighbourhood in Purasawalkam. The area of Doveton acquired its name after Capt. John Doveton, who served as a captain commandant of the Seventh Regiment of Infantry.Capt.John Doveton is the Founder of the Doveton Group of Schools situated at no 1,Ritherdon Road, Vepery .
The name Doveton originated by the presence of the Doveton group of schools in the area.  

The Doveton clock tower is a prominent landmark and is located at the 5 road junction called Doveton Signal.

Surroundings
Purasawalkam
Egmore
Vepery
Pattalam, Chennai
Pulianthope
Basin Bridge
Otteri
Perambur
Kellys
Kilpauk
Choolai

Nearby Railway stations
Chennai Egmore railway station.
Puratchi Thalaivar Dr. M. G. Ramachandran Central Railway Station.

Neighbourhoods in Chennai